The 1996 Pacific hurricane season is tied with 2021 for the most Pacific hurricanes to make landfall on Mexico in one year, with four striking the country. It was a below average season that produced 9 tropical storms, 5 hurricanes and 2 major hurricanes. With 9 tropical storms, 1996 ranks as the second-least active Pacific hurricane season on record. It officially began May 15, 1996, in the eastern north Pacific and on June 1, 1996, in the central north Pacific. It ended on November 30, 1996. These dates conventionally delimit the period of each year when most tropical cyclones form in the northeastern Pacific Ocean. The season slightly exceeded these bounds when tropical storm One-E formed on May 13.

Although tropical cyclone formation was below average, the season was destructive. Twelve tropical cyclones formed during the season, of which five made landfall and two other impacted land areas. Two tropical cyclones that formed in other basins entered the eastern north Pacific Ocean. Early in the season, three tropical cyclones impacted Mexico in a ten-day span, while the first cyclone of the season formed before the season officially began. Hurricane Douglas was the strongest storm, reaching Category 4 intensity on the Saffir-Simpson Hurricane Scale and had its beginnings in the Atlantic as Hurricane Cesar.

Seasonal summary 

The season officially began on May 15 in Eastern Pacific and on June 1 in Central Pacific; both ended on November 30. This season was below average in activity. In the eastern north Pacific, eleven tropical cyclones formed. Of these, four became hurricanes, one of which were major hurricanes because they reached Category 3 or higher on the Saffir-Simpson Hurricane Scale. The remainder were tropical storms. In addition, one Atlantic hurricane, Hurricane Cesar, crossed into this zone from the Atlantic Ocean and was renamed Douglas. None of the systems in the eastern north Pacific crossed 140°W and entered the central Pacific. The last time that happened was in the 1979 season.

In the central north Pacific, one tropical depression formed. In addition, a depression crossed the dateline from the western Pacific before dissipating in this basin. None of these two systems reached tropical storm strength. In addition, data from the Joint Typhoon Warning Center, on September 1 Tropical Depression Rick crossed the International Dateline, entering into CPHC's area of responsibility; however, this storm was not included into CPHC database. The storm eventually became extratropical on September 3 over open waters.

In terms of the number of storms, the season was below average. Despite this, there were a large number of landfalls. Of note is the fact that three tropical cyclones approached close to, or made landfall on, Mexico during a ten-day span from June 23 to July 3. In all, a record-setting four hurricanes (Alma, Boris, Fausto, and Hernan) struck the coastline.

The Accumulated Cyclone Energy (ACE) index for the 1996 Pacific hurricane season (Eastern Pacific and Central Pacific combined) as calculated by Colorado State University using data from the National Hurricane Center was 53.9 units, making this season a below-normal season. It is one of the lowest totals ever recorded, with only the 1977, 2010 and 2007 seasons having a lower ACE.

Systems

Tropical Storm One-E 

The season had an early start on May 13 when a tropical wave in the open ocean organized into Tropical Depression One-E. The depression moved west-northwest and strengthened into a tropical storm on May 14. Wind shear steadily weakened the cyclone until it dissipated early on May 17. This system was the only tropical storm to form in May during the period from 1992–99.

Tropical Storm One-E was not assigned a name because it was determined to be a tropical storm after the season was over. The storm was initially forecast to become a tropical storm, but information available at the time did not warrant the upgrade. Subsequently, wind reports relayed from the US Coast Guard to the National Hurricane Center suggested that this cyclone was a tropical storm.

This tropical cyclone impacted two ships. The first — called the True Blue — was near the fringes of the storm and escaped. The other — the trimaran Solar Wind — provided wind observations until communications with the vessel were lost after 0600 UTC on May 14. Despite a search by the US Coast Guard, the ship and its two-person crew were never found.

Tropical Depression Two-E 

On May 15 an area of disturbed weather in the Intertropical Convergence Zone developed into a tropical depression. The disturbance was not readily traceable back to a tropical wave from the Atlantic. As it slowly moved west, Two-E experienced a few intermittent bursts of convection. However, the depression gradually became less organized during the remainder of its life. On May 18, the cyclone's organization deteriorated markedly until it dissipated the next morning.

Tropical Depression Two-E never threatened land. Consequently, there were no reports of deaths or damage.

Hurricane Alma 

On June 20, the southern part of the same tropical wave that spawned Tropical Storm Arthur in the Atlantic overcame shear to strengthen into Tropical Depression Three-E. It reached tropical storm intensity that same day. When the shear relaxed, Alma strengthened into a hurricane. Weak steering currents sent Alma towards the Mexican coast. It made landfall near Lázaro Cárdenas, Michoacán on June 23 and almost immediately went back out to sea. Alma slowly paralleled the coast as the topography disrupted the cyclone's circulation. Alma weakened to tropical storm intensity on June 24 and to tropical depression intensity on June 26. It dissipated the next day.

Hurricane Alma was the first of three consecutive storms to come close to, or make landfall on, the Pacific coast of Mexico during a ten-day span. At least three, and possibly twenty, people were killed. Three were killed when a house near Lázaro Cárdenas collapsed. There were unconfirmed reports that 17 people were killed by floods in the state of Puebla caused by Alma's rains. Trees were downed and power was knocked out to many places. Roads were flooded and covered with debris throughout the affected area.

Hurricane Boris 

On June 27, a tropical wave developed convection and became Tropical Depression Four. It moved north and slowly intensified. The rate of intensification increased and the depression became a tropical storm on June 28. Boris then made landfall on June 29 about midway between Lázaro Cárdenas and Acapulco. Boris then moved offshore after turning to the southwest and dissipated on July 1 while south of Puerto Vallarta.

Hurricane Boris was, in general, a well-forecast storm. Due to the short time when the system was at or above tropical storm intensity, long-range forecasts were not verified. Boris caused at least five deaths. One person was killed in Tecpan. Nearby, three other people drowned and five fishers were missing. In Acapulco, a child was killed when a roof collapsed. Rain was heavy throughout the impacted region, with the highest totals in Guerrero.

Tropical Storm Cristina 

On July 1, a tropical wave organized into Tropical Depression Five-E. The location of the depression was the easternmost since the depression that eventually became Hurricane Paul in the 1982 season. Five-E strengthened into Tropical Storm Cristina on July 2 as it continued its west-northwest track. Cristina was almost a hurricane at the time of its landfall near Puerto Angel on July 3. Cristina dissipated over the mountains of Mexico on July 3.

As a whole, both Cristina's intensity and track were well-forecast. However, the tropical cyclone's short life made verification of a small number of forecasts limited. When Cristina was approaching, the Mexican government issued a tropical storm warning for the coast between Tapachula and Punta Maldonado on July 2.

Tropical Storm Cristina killed one person, a fisherman, who was aboard a boat caught at sea. Another person from that boat was missing, and a third individual was rescued. Eleven other fishing boats, with a total of twenty-two people aboard, were missing. Their fate is unknown. The National Hurricane Center received no reports of damage due to Tropical Storm Cristina; however, there was flooding due to storm surge and damage from wind. It also produced rain.

Tropical Depression Six-E 

On July 4, a persistent area of thunderstorms organized into a tropical depression. Weak steering currents slowly moved it northwest. Easterly wind shear inhibited the development of the system. Despite the wind shear, Six-E was forecast to strengthen into a tropical storm, but it instead weakened to a swirl of clouds and advisories were ended on July 5. Tropical Depression Six-E dissipated on July 6.

This cyclone never came ashore. Consequently, no reports of damage or deaths were received by the National Hurricane Center.

Hurricane Douglas 

Hurricane Douglas was a continuation of Atlantic Hurricane Cesar, which crossed Central America. Continuing Cesar's nearly due-west heading, it was still a tropical storm when it entered the Pacific on July 29, and quickly regained hurricane status.

Douglas strengthened over the next two days as it turned west-northwest, paralleling the coast of Mexico. It slow weakening began on August 2 as it entered cooler waters, and it officially dissipated on August 6, though like many Pacific hurricanes, a remnant circulation could be tracked westward for several days afterward.

Compared with the long-term average, Hurricane Douglas was a well-forecast storm. The cyclone passed close enough to Mexico to necessitate a tropical storm warning starting on July 29 for the coast from Salina Cruz to Acapulco, with a watch along a further section of coast. The watches and warnings were discontinued on July 30.

Hurricane Douglas brought up to 6 in (150 mm) of rain on the south coast of Mexico and resulted in a 4-ft (1.2-m) storm surge. No deaths or damages were attributed to the Douglas portion of Hurricane Cesar-Douglas.

Tropical Depression Seventeen-W 

A tropical depression, which formed on August 13, from a cutoff area of low pressure area, crossed the dateline on August 14. It continued to head east, passing close to Midway Island. It dissipated on August 14, although the remnants of the system hung around the area for a few more days.

Seventeen-W brought light winds, with gusts reaching gale-force, to Midway Island. It also brought about 2.5 in (63.5 mm) of rain. After the cyclone dissipated, showers and gusty winds continued to occur on Midway and Kure for a few more days.

Seventeen-W was the first tropical cyclone to cross the international dateline in either direction since Typhoon John in the 1994 season.

Tropical Depression Dolly 

Hurricane Dolly struck eastern Mexico and managed to hold together, remaining a tropical depression as it entered the eastern Pacific Ocean late on August 24. Although Tropical Depression Dolly entered the eastern Pacific, the National Hurricane Center did not re-classify the system. No re-intensification occurred after the system entered the eastern Pacific, and it had dissipated as a tropical cyclone by the following day, about 40 mi (65 km) west of San Juanito in the Islas Marías.

Tropical Storm Elida 

A tropical wave organized into Tropical Depression Eight-E on August 30. The cyclone paralleled the coast of Mexico and also gradually decelerated. Despite some wind shear, Eight-E strengthened into a tropical storm on September 2 and was named Elida. The cyclone then drifted into cooler waters, was devoid of deep convection on September 5, and dissipated the next day.

The storm was forecast slightly better than the long-term averages for the eastern North Pacific. Elida posed enough of a threat to the Baja California Peninsula to require a tropical storm warning for the Baja California Peninsula south of Cabo San Lázaro on September 3. The warning was lifted on September 5 after the threat ended. While passing offshore, the tropical storm killed six people and affected 1,200 others, but Elida caused no known damage.

Hurricane Fausto 

The precursor disturbance to Fausto was first noticed over Venezuela as early as August 31, and may have been related to the tropical wave that spawned Hurricane Fran. By September 4 the wave had crossed Central America into the Pacific; it steadily organized until it was upgraded to Tropical Storm Fausto on September 10.

The hurricane weakened as an approaching trough increased shear over the storm; this same trough also turned the storm north on the September 13, where it made landfall as a minimal hurricane on Baja California that day. On September 14, the storm turned northeastward across the Gulf of California, and dissipated inland over the Sierra Madre range after its second landfall as a hurricane. Its extratropical remnants flared up briefly over northern Mexico and the U.S. state of Texas, but otherwise soon lost their identity.

Heavy rainfall was accompanied with the passage of this cyclone, with a storm total of 18.50 inches (470 mm) reported at San Vicente de la Sierra. Damage in Mexico was relatively minor, with only a single casualty caused by a downed power line. Damage totaled to around $800,000 (1996 USD).

Tropical Depression One-C 

A tropical disturbance organized into a tropical depression on September 15. It headed west until September 17. That day, it turned to the west for two days before heading back west-northwest on September 19. It soon began to weaken and dissipated the next day. At its most intense, Tropical Depression One-C had winds of 35 mph (55 km/h) and unknown pressure.

The tropical cyclone caused no known impact and never came near land.

Tropical Storm Genevieve 

In the Gulf of Tehuantepec, an area of disturbed weather containing convection formed on September 23. It moved westward without incident until September 27, when it developed stronger convection and became Tropical Depression Ten-E. Immediately thereafter, it strengthened into a tropical storm and was named Genevieve while it continued its westward track.

The tropical storm then turned to the west-southwest as steering currents collapsed. The cyclone began a time of erratic motion, which included two loops. The erratic motion also exposed Genevieve to wind shear, and the tropical storm weakened to a tropical depression on October 1. On October 6, the shear temporarily weakened, and Tropical Depression Genevieve restrengthened into a tropical storm. The cyclone's wandering continued, and it entrained dry air. This dry air weakened the system to a depression for a second time on October 8, and Genevieve dissipated the next day. Brief flare-ups of convection could still be seen for a few days thereafter.

Tropical Storm Genevieve was a rather poorly forecast storm. Most tropical cyclone prediction models indicated a northwesterly track that never happened, and also over-intensified the system. In addition, advisories on Tropical Depression Genevieve were discontinued on October 3, and only resumed three days later. Later analysis determined that Genevieve had been a tropical depression for this whole time.

Tropical Storm Genevieve never came near land, and consequently no watches or warnings were required for any location. The tropical cyclone had no impact on any land.

Hurricane Hernan 

On September 30, a tropical wave organized into Tropical Depression Eleven-E. Gradual strengthening ensued, and the depression strengthened into a tropical storm twelve hours later and was named Hernan. Hernan's initial track was to the west, but the system gradually started to recurve. Its center of circulation reformed, and Hernan briefly turned to the northwest again. By October 2, and Hernan was close to the coast. It strengthened into a hurricane that day. Late on October 2 and early on October 3 Hernan closely paralleled the coast. Interaction with land weakened the cyclone, and when Hernan made landfall on October 3 near Barra de Navidad, Jalisco, it was only a minimal hurricane. Land weakened the cyclone, and by the time it emerged into the ocean north of Puerto Vallarta, it was so disorganized that it dissipated on October 5.

The National Hurricane Center forecasts on the hurricane were generally forecast slightly worse than the "average" system. Errors by tropical cyclone prediction models were attributed mainly to Hernan's recurvature. In terms of intensity, this system was correctly predicted to become a hurricane although advisories underforecast its eventual intensity.

For the coast from Acapulco to Manzanillo, a tropical storm warning was issued on October 1. A hurricane watch was issued from Zihuatanejo to Manzanillo on October 2. It was upgraded to a warning later that day. Also on October 2, the coast from Manzanillo to San Blas was placed under a tropical storm warning. Meanwhile, the hurricane warning was extended to Cabo Corrientes. On October 3, the hurricane warning was extended to San Blas and the tropical storm warning was extended to Mazatlán.

Because it made landfall in a sparsely populated area, Hernan killed no one. Around 1,000 homes were damaged or destroyed and 100 people were injured. Flooding occurred in Melaque, Jalisco. Flooding also caused washed-out roads along Federal Highways 200 and 80. In many areas, telephone service was interrupted and power outages occurred. Along the coasts of Colima and Jalisco, waves caused by Hernan reached 13 ft (3.9 m) in height.

Tropical Depression Twelve-E 

A system acquired enough convection and became organized enough to be considered a tropical depression on November 7. Although the environment was initially favourable and the system was almost upgraded into a tropical storm as was forecast, wind shear kept the cyclone weak. Its convection was eventually destroyed and advisories were ended on November 10. Twelve-E dissipated on November 11 and no deaths or damages were reported.

Storm names 
The following names were used for named storms that formed in the eastern Pacific in 1996. Names that were not assigned are marked in gray. No names were retired, so it was used again in the 2002 season. This is the same list used for the 1990 season, except for Winnie, which had interchanged with Wallis.

For storms that form in the Central Pacific Hurricane Center's area of responsibility, encompassing the area between 140 degrees west and the International Date Line, all names are used in a series of four rotating lists. The next four names that were slated for use in 1996 are shown below; however, none of them were used.

Season effects 
This is a table of all the storms that formed in the 1996 Pacific hurricane season. It includes their duration (within the basin), names, intensities, areas affected, damages, and death totals. Deaths in parentheses are additional and indirect (an example of an indirect death would be a traffic accident), but were still related to that storm. Damage and deaths include totals while the storm was extratropical, a wave, or a low, and all the damage figures are in 1996 USD.

See also 

 List of Pacific hurricanes
 Pacific hurricane season
 1996 Atlantic hurricane season
 1996 Pacific typhoon season
 1996 North Indian Ocean cyclone season
 South-West Indian Ocean cyclone seasons: 1995–96, 1996–97
 Australian region cyclone seasons: 1995–96, 1996–97
 South Pacific cyclone seasons: 1995–96, 1996–97

Notes

References

External links 

 NHC 1996 Pacific hurricane season archive
 HPC 1996 Tropical Cyclone Rainfall Pages
 Central Pacific Hurricane Center archive

 
Pacific hurricane seasons